Saint-Front is a hamlet in Saskatchewan.

Unincorporated communities in Saskatchewan
Spalding No. 368, Saskatchewan